Group Captain Sidney Joseph "Jack" Cottle MBE's military career began during World War I. He became a flying ace in the latter years of the war, credited with thirteen aerial victories. His service would span three decades and three continents before his final retirement in 1944.

Early life and service
Although Cottle was English-born, while young he was moved to Zululand, where he grew up. He was dubbed "the man with the funny elbows" by the locals. In 1914, he enlisted in the South African Mounted Rifles. He served with them until he transferred into the Royal Flying Corps (RFC) in 1917.

World War I flying service
He was commissioned in the RFC on 27 July 1917. He was forwarded to No. 45 Squadron RFC in Italy to fly a Sopwith Camel. On 10 March 1918, he and Richard Dawes destroyed an enemy DFW two-seater southeast of Salgarada. On 18 May, Cottle singlehandedly scored his second victory, setting an Albatros D.III afire. On 30 May 1918, Cottle was wounded in action. On 5 July 1918, Cottle set an LVG two-seater on fire; it was last seen still apparently under control. No score, though it was ruled "driven down". He did score twice more in July, though, becoming an ace on its last day. He scored three times in early August; then on the 31st he destroyed an Albatros D.III at 0935, killed Josef Pürer and driven his D.III down into captivity at 0940, driven a third D.III down into captivity at 0945, and drove an enemy reconnaissance two-seater down at 1035. The four wins pushed his total to eleven confirmed wins.

At this point, 45 Squadron shifted theaters, from Italy back to France, thus removing Cottle from combat for a time. Cottle then scored on both 3 and 5 November 1918, ending the war with thirteen confirmed victories and that one flaming unconfirmed.

Post World War I life and service
Cottle stayed in the Royal Air Force and became a Flight Commander in No. 79 Squadron RAF in 1919. He then transferred into No. 48 Squadron RAF in India. He married a major in the Women's Indian Army. Cottle was then transferred to Iraq in 1924. In 1932, he was assigned to duty with the Egyptian Air Force. He was promoted to Group Captain in 1940 which was his rank on retirement on 21 June 1941. However, he was re-employed until 1944, when he finally retired. A few years later, he moved to India. He died there on 15 August 1967.

Honors and awards
Sidney Joseph Cottle was awarded the MBE by his king for his service.

The text of the award citation for the Distinguished Flying Cross reads:

Sidney Joseph Cottle also was awarded the Silver Medal of Military Valor by a grateful Italian government in 1918.

Notes

References
 Shores, Christopher F., Norman L. R. Franks & Russell Guest, Above the Trenches: A Complete Record of the Fighter Aces and Units of the British Empire Air Forces 1915–1920 . Grub Street, 1990. , .

Royal Flying Corps officers
British World War I flying aces
Members of the Order of the British Empire
Recipients of the Silver Medal of Military Valor
Colony of Natal people
Recipients of the Distinguished Flying Cross (United Kingdom)
Royal Air Force personnel of World War II
1892 births
1967 deaths